= Constituency PSW-144 =

Reserved constituency of the Provincial Assembly of Sindh, Pakistan

PSW-144
- Provincial Reserved constituency for the Provincial Assembly of Sindh

Current constituency

PSW-144 is a Constituency of the Provincial Assembly of Sindh.

== See also ==
- Sindh
